Salix cinerea (common sallow, grey sallow, grey willow, grey-leaved sallow, large grey willow, pussy willow, rusty sallow) is a species of willow native to Europe and western Asia.

The plant provides a great deal of nectar for pollinators. It was rated in the top 10, with a ranking of second place, for most nectar production (nectar per unit cover per year) in a UK plants survey conducted by the AgriLand project which is supported by the UK Insect Pollinators Initiative.

Plant

It is a deciduous shrub or small tree growing 4–15 metres (13–50 ft) tall. The leaves are spirally arranged, 2–9 cm (1– in) long and 1–3 cm (– in) broad (exceptionally up to 16 cm long and 5 cm broad), green above, hairy below, with a crenate margin. The flowers are produced in early spring in catkins 2–5 cm long; it is dioecious with male and female catkins on separate plants. The male catkins are silvery at first, turning yellow when the pollen is released; the female catkins are greenish grey, maturing in early summer to release the numerous tiny seeds embedded in white cottony down which assists wind dispersal.

The two subspecies are:
S. c. cinerea - central and eastern Europe, western Asia, shrub to 4–6 m (rarely 10 m) tall, with smooth bark, leaves densely hairy below with pale yellow-grey hairs, stipules large, persistent until autumn
S. c. oleifolia (Sm.) Macreight (syn. S. atrocinerea Brot.) - western Europe, northwest Africa, shrub or tree to 10–15 m tall, with furrowed bark, leaves thinly hairy below with dark red-brown hairs, stipules small, early deciduous

Some overlap in the distributions (not indicated in the map, right) occurs, with both occurring in a broad band north to south through France, and scattered specimens of S. c. cinerea west to Ireland, western France, and Morocco; scattered specimens of S. c. oleifolia occur east to the Netherlands. Specimens of S. c. oleifolia in southern Scandinavia are planted or naturalised, not native. Intermediate specimens also occur.

Ecology

It usually grows in wetlands. The two subspecies differ slightly in requirements, with S. c. cinerea generally restricted to basic marshland and fen habitats, while S. c. oleifolia is less demanding, occurring in both alkaline marshes and acidic bogs and streamsides. A common herbivore of Salix cinerea is Phratora vulgatissima, which prefers and is more common on female plants. Anthocoris nemorum, a natural enemy of Phratora vulgatissima, is also more common on S. cinerea.

Invasive species
Salix cinerea is an invasive species in New Zealand and is listed on the National Pest Plant Accord, which means it cannot be sold or distributed. S. cinerea is also highly invasive in south-eastern Australia, with the entire genus listed as a Weed of National Significance. The species was introduced to stop erosion along riverbanks, but has since caused worse erosion over time by widening and shallowing invaded streams.

References

External links

 
 
 

cinerea
Flora of Ukraine
Plants described in 1753
Taxa named by Carl Linnaeus
Flora of the Channel Islands